Bhagyawan
is a 1993 Indian Bollywood drama film directed by S. K. Subash and produced by Upendra Jha. It stars Govinda and Juhi Chawla in pivotal roles. Dialogues were written by Kamlesh Pandey. Lyricists were Sameer Anjaan, Hasrat Jaipuri and M. G. Hashmat. It was released on 10 December 1993. The film didn't perform well at the box office, and was declared as flop.

Cast
 Govinda as Police Inspector Amar
 Juhi Chawla as Geeta
 Pran as Dhanraj
 Asha Parekh as Savitri
 Aruna Irani as Renu
 Ranjeet as Hira
 Johnny Lever as Johnny
 Kirti Kumar as Vishwas
 Sripradha as Alka
 Suraj Chaddha as Kishen
 Shobha Singh as Radha
 Gurbachan Singh as Rana

Soundtrack

References

External links

1990s Hindi-language films
1993 films
Films scored by Anand–Milind
Indian drama films